In mathematics, an orthostochastic matrix is a doubly stochastic matrix whose entries are the squares of 
the absolute values of the entries of some orthogonal matrix.

The detailed definition is as follows. A square matrix B of size n is doubly stochastic (or bistochastic) if all its rows and columns sum to 1 and all its entries are nonnegative real numbers. It is orthostochastic if there exists an orthogonal matrix O such that 

All 2-by-2 doubly stochastic matrices are orthostochastic (and also unistochastic)
since for any 

we find the corresponding orthogonal matrix 

with 
 such that 

For larger n the sets of bistochastic matrices includes the set of unistochastic matrices,
which includes the set of orthostochastic matrices and these inclusion relations are proper.

References
 

Matrices